{{Infobox song
| name       = Uh La La La
| cover      = alexiauhlalala.jpg
| alt        =
| type       = single
| artist     = Alexia
| album      = Fan Club (original version) and The Party (Almighty edit)
| released   = 16 June 1997
| recorded   =
| studio     =
| venue      =
| genre      = Europop
| length     = 3:45
| label      = *DWA Records
Sony Music
| writer     = *Roberto Zanetti
Alessia Aquilani
| producer   = Roberto Zanetti
| prev_title = Number One
| prev_year  = 1996
| next_title = Virtual Reality
| next_year  = 1997
}}

"Uh La La La" is a 1997 song recorded by Italian singer Alexia featuring additional vocals by an uncredited male rapper. It was released as the fourth single from her debut album, Fan Club (1997), and is written by Roberto Zanetti and Alexia herself. The song was a summer hit of 1997 in Europe and became Alexia's international breakout success. It reached number-one in Spain, number two in Finland and was a top 10 hit also in Austria, Ireland, Italy, Scotland, Sweden and the UK. After its success in Europe, the song was remixed for a UK release the following year, which also saw release in Australia, where it peaked at number 17. This was her last single to be released by different labels in different territories as after this all her releases would be by Sony Music.

Release
The song was released in Italy on CD and 12" (coded DWA 97.02), with releases in other European countries following. As before (and for the final time) the German edition would be released by ZYX, the Spanish release by Blanco y Negro, the French release by Panic (a subsidiary of Polygram), and the Finnish release by K-Tel. A full set of releases was commissioned for Europe by Sony Music, once again on their Dancepool label; a maxi CD, 2-track CD, and 12" release (Sony code 664517). Two remix releases followed; one entitled 'Remix' and a doublepack of remixes by Fathers of Sound. The Fathers of Sound remixes would contain vocals and lyrics that were not on the original version. This was the second and last single to feature radio jingles on the CD.

After officially signing to Sony for all future releases, plans were made to properly launch Alexia's career outside of Europe. In 1998, Almighty Records were commissioned to provide a remix and edit for the UK market (Sony code 665567) in order to launch her career. The remix was also used for the Australian release later that year (Sony code 665766). Due to its popularity, the Almighty edit would be released on all versions of Alexia's second album, The Party. In 1999, the track was released in America under the Epidrome label.

Critical reception
AllMusic editor Tom Demalon described the song is a "jaunty, infectious number that leans a bit more to pop". Larry Flick from Billboard wrote that "without question, "Uh La La La" is as infectious as they get—just perfect for those hot and steamy summer nights. And producer Roberto Zanetti (more commonly known as Robyx) is in ultra-fine form here. In a perfect world, this would surely be a hit." A reviewer from Music & Media stated that the song "sounds like a surefire summer hit; a simple sunny melody, a catchy sing-a-long refrain ("Uh la la la, I love you baby"), a stomp/clap rhythm, some nice shuffle beats and a touch of rap. Another sign of success is that the song has already inspired a copy-cat version (2 Eivissa's "Oh La La La" (...) which samples Crystal Waters' "Gypsy Woman")." Juha Soininen viewed it as "a slow, reggaeish downtempo" in his 2020 book Move Your Body (2 The 90's).

Chart performance
"Uh La La La" was a major hit on the charts on several continents, becoming one of Alexia's most successful songs to date. In Europe, it peaked at number-one in Spain and number four in the singer's native Italy, with a total of 19 weeks inside the Italian singles chart. Additionally, the song made it to the top 10 also in Austria, Finland (number two), Ireland, Scotland, Sweden and the United Kingdom. In the latter, it reached number ten in its first week on the UK Singles Chart, on March 15, 1998. Additionally, "Uh La La La" went on becoming a top 20 hit in France, Iceland, the Netherlands and Switzerland. On the Eurochart Hot 100, it charted in the top 30, reaching number 22 in September 1997. Outside Europe, it peaked at number 17 in Australia, number 30 in New Zealand and number 39 in Canada. The single earned a gold record in France and Sweden, with a sale of 250,000 and 15,000 units.

Music video
The accompanying music video for "Uh La La La" was directed by Luca Lucini. It sees Alexia performing the song while driving a jeep with her friends on the streets in Miami.

Track listing

 12"
"Uh La La La" (Club Mix) – 7:26
"Uh La La La" (Cellular Mix) – 6:05
"Uh La La La" (Original Mix) – 6:30
"Uh La La La" (Acappella) – 3:36

 12" - Remix
"Uh La La La" (Fargetta's Mix) – 5:30
"Uh La La La" (Bump Mix) – 4:55
"Uh La La La" (Beach Mix) – 6:22
	
 CD single
"Uh La La La" (Radio Mix) – 3:45
"Uh La La La" (Cellular Mix) – 6:05

 CD maxi single
"Uh La La La" (Radio Mix) – 3:45
"Uh La La La" (Club Mix) – 7:28
"Uh La La La" (Cellular Mix) – 6:05
"Uh La La La" (F.O.S. Man Vocal Mix) – 6:25
"Uh La La La" (Original Mix) – 6:30
"Uh La La La" (F.O.S. Renaissance Dub) – 5:40
"Uh La La La" (Radio Spot 1) – 0:10
"Uh La La La" (Radio Spot 2) – 0:10
"Uh La La La" (Radio Spot 3) – 0:10

Charts

Weekly charts

Year-end charts

Certifications

Blog 27 version

"Uh La La La" was covered by Polish pop music group Blog 27 and released as their debut single in Poland in May 2005. The song enjoyed popularity in the Polish media and later appeared on the band's debut album LOL'', released in November 2005. The music video for the track was directed by Anna Maliszewska and features teenagers skateboarding and playing the spin the bottle game. The song was released internationally in early 2006 and entered the Top 40 in German-speaking countries and Italy.

Track listing
 CD single
"Uh La La La" (Short Edit) – 3:13
"I Want What I Want" – 3:04

 CD maxi single
"Uh La La La" (Short Edit) – 3:13
"Uh La La La" (Extended) – 4:23
"Uh La La La" (Karaoke Version) – 3:13
"I Want What I Want" – 3:03
"Uh La La La" (Video)

Charts

References

1997 singles
1997 songs
2006 singles
Alexia (Italian singer) songs
Blog 27 songs
Dance-pop songs
English-language Italian songs
Number-one singles in Italy
Number-one singles in Spain
Songs written by Alexia (Italian singer)
Songs written by Roberto Zanetti
Sony Music singles